William Duplissea (April 30, 1950 – July 1, 2020) was a Republican Assembly member from California's 20th State Assembly district, who served from 1986 until he was defeated for reelection in 1988 by Democrat Ted Lempert. He represented San Mateo County which is located in the Peninsula subregion of the San Francisco Bay Area.

Political Service
Duplissea served as a member of the Metropolitan Transportation Commission, which serves the nine Bay Area Counties. He served as the Administrative Director of the Division of Workers' Compensation, Director of the Office of Manufacturing Retention, Public Member of the OSHA Appeals Board serving the administrations of George Deukmejian and Pete Wilson.

Assembly career
Duplissea was elected by the Republican Caucus to the Leadership position of Caucus Secretary. Appointed by the Speaker of the California Assembly, Vice Chairman of the Assembly Committee on Transportation. He served on 4 committees during his time in the Assembly which were Labor & Employment, Revenue & Taxation, Ways & Means, and Jobs, Economic Development, and the Economy.

Business career
Vice President California Truck Trailer Services Inc. 1980–2020
President Bayview Trailer and Equipment Inc. 1980–1984
General Partner Carlos Cleaners and Launderers 1980–2020

Education
BA in History from the University of San Francisco in 1972.
AA from Menlo College in 1970

Personal life
Duplissea was born in San Francisco, California. He lived in San Carlos, California. Duplissea died in Redwood City, California.

References

External links
Profile of Bill Duplissea

1950 births
2020 deaths
Republican Party members of the California State Assembly
People from Redwood City, California
People from San Carlos, California
Businesspeople from San Francisco
Politicians from San Francisco
Menlo College alumni
University of San Francisco alumni